Giovanni Tommaso Cimello (c. 1510 in Monte San Giovanni Campano – c. 1591 in Monte San Giovanni Campano) was a poet, musician, composer, and musical theorist employed by the Colonna family and active at the Aragonese Corts in Naples.

Works
 Canzoni Villanesche al Modo Napolitano a 3 voci, a 1545 collection of villanelle, one of the earliest following that by Nola (1541), and preceding those by Willaert (1545), and Donati (1550)
 1st Book of Madrigals for 4 voices, a 1548 work dedicated to Fabrizio Colonna

Selected recordings
 Villanelle on Napolitane. Tesori di Napoli Vol.7 Ensemble Micrologus, Cappella della Pietà de' Turchini. Opus111
 Madrigal "fuggi'l sereno" on In morte de Madonna Laura. Huelgas Ensemble, dir. Paul Van Nevel.

References

1510s births
1591 deaths
Year of birth uncertain
16th-century Italian composers
Italian male composers
Musicians from Naples